Beate Sodeik is a German cell biologist who is Professor of Medical Sciences at the Hannover Medical School. Her research considers the biology of viral infections, with a particular focus on Herpes simplex virus.

Early life and education 
Sodeik was an undergraduate student in the University of Bonn, where she studied biology. She earned a Diploma in Cell Biology, where she analysed autophagy in Amoeba proteus. After graduating, she received a DAAD scholarship, and moved to the Columbia University Vagelos College of Physicians and Surgeons. During her time at Columbia, Sodeik worked on integrin receptors of human neutrophils. She was a doctoral student in cell biology at the European Molecular Biology Laboratory in Heidelberg University. Her research considered the assembly of the Vaccina virus (cowpox). After earning her doctorate, Sodeik returned to the United States, where she joined Ari Helenius at Yale University. At Yale, Sodeik studied the early phases of Herpes simplex virus.

Research and career 
Sodeik was made a Senior Scientist at Hannover Medical School in 1997. She completed her habilitation in the cell biology of DNA viruses and the maturation of Vaccinia. She was eventually promoted to Professor. Since starting her postdoctoral research, Sodeik has explored the cell biology of Herpes simplex virus. She is interested in virus-host interactions, virus assembly and viral replication.

Selected publications

References 

20th-century German biologists
Living people
Year of birth missing (living people)
Yale University faculty
University of Bonn alumni
Columbia University alumni
Heidelberg University alumni
Cell biologists